Petra Soukupová (born 25 July 1982) is contemporary Czech author, playwright, and screenwriter.

Life and career
Petra Soukupová was born on 25 July 1982 in Česká Lípa, Czechoslovakia. She studied screenwriting and dramaturgy at the Film and TV School of the Academy of Performing Arts (FAMU) in Prague. She is the author of five books for adults and two children's books. She was a screenwriter on the sitcom Comeback (2008-2010) and the series Kosmo (2016). Petra Soukupová lives and works in Prague.

Awards
 2008 Jiří Orten Award 
 2010 Magnesia Litera Award for Book of the Year

Bibliography
 K moři. Brno: Host, 2007.  
 Zmizet. Brno: Host, 2009. .
 Marta v roce vetřelce. Brno: Host, 2011.  
 Pod sněhem. Brno: Host, 2015. 
 Nejlepší pro všechny. Brno: Host, 2017. 

Children's Books
 Bertík a čmuchadlo. Brno: Host, 2014. 
 Kdo zabil Snížka? Brno: Host, 2017.

References 

1982 births
Living people
21st-century novelists
Czech novelists
Czech women novelists
People from Česká Lípa
21st-century Czech women writers